Rivière du Nord or Rivière-du-Nord (River of the north) may refer to:

Streams
 Rivière du Nord (Laurentides), a tributary of the Ottawa River in the Laurentides region of Quebec, Canada
 Rivière du Nord (Hudson Bay), in the Hudson Bay watershed of Nunavik, Quebec, Canada
 Rivière du Nord (New Brunswick), a tributary of Caraquet Bay west of Caraquet, New Brunswick, Canada
 Rivière du Nord (Muskrat River tributary), in Chaudière-Appalaches, Quebec, Canada

Communities
La Rivière-du-Nord Regional County Municipality, in the Laurentides region of Quebec, Canada
 Rivière-du-Nord (electoral district), a Canadian federal electoral district

See also
North River (disambiguation)